Latin Lovers is a compilation album produced by M6 Metropole television joining well-known artists. The album was released on 23 June 2014 and includes tributes to Latin music.

Covers
The album includes covers of classic Latin hits from:
Pablo Alborán (Spain)
Francis Cabrel (France)
Davide Esposito (Italy)
Julio Iglesias (Spain)
Juanes (Colombia)
Grégory Lemarchal (France)
Madonna (United States)
Ricky Martin (Puerto Rico)
Miami Sound Machine (United States)
Eros Ramazzotti (Italy)
Santana (United States)

Artists
The songs were interpreted by:
Pablo Alborán (Spain)
Julio Iglesias Jr. (Spain)
Nyco Lilliu (France)
Debi Nova (Costa Rica)
Nuno Resende (Portugal)
Damien Sargue (France)

Nyco Lilliu released a music video for "La solitudine", a cover of a song by Laura Pausini, but it was not an official single for him.

Track listing

Bonus Tracks

Charts

Weekly charts

Year-end charts

References

External links 
 Official Site Latin Lovers

2014 compilation albums